Aytch Greer Skousen (September 24, 1916 – March 20, 1988) was a Mexican basketball player who competed in the 1936 Summer Olympics.

Born in Casas Grandes, Chihuahua, he was part of the Mexican basketball team which won the bronze medal. He played five matches.

In 1950-1951 he taught and coached public school for the Toyah School District in Toyah, Texas. Skousen died in San Antonio, Texas.

References

External links
Profile
XI JUEGOS OLIMPICOS BERLIN 1936 BRONCE | EQUIPO DE BALONCESTO
Aytch Greer Skousen (1916-1988)

1916 births
1988 deaths
Basketball players at the 1936 Summer Olympics
Mexican men's basketball players
Mexican people of Danish descent
Mexican people of English descent
Olympic basketball players of Mexico
Olympic bronze medalists for Mexico
Basketball players from Chihuahua
Olympic medalists in basketball
Medalists at the 1936 Summer Olympics
People from Casas Grandes Municipality